Bollnäs GoIF/BF (Bollnäs GIF), "Giffarna", is a bandy club founded in 1895 from Bollnäs in Sweden who play at Sävstaås Idrottspark. The club won the World Cup in 2005. and 2019.

History
Bollnäs GIF was founded in 1895.

Bollnäs GIF have played seven Swedish Championship finals and won two of them, in 1951 and 1956, both against Örebro SK.

Squad

Honours

Domestic
 Swedish Champions:
 Winners (2): 1951, 1956
 Runners-up (4): 1943, 2010, 2011, 2017

Cup
 Svenska Cupen:
 Winners (2): 2005, 2008

International
 World Cup:
 Winners (2): 2005, 2019
 Runners-up (1): 2008
 Champions Cup:
 Winners (1): 2014
 Runners-up (1): 2011

References

External links
 Official website
 Bollnäs gif at bandysidan

 
Bandy clubs established in 1895
Bandy clubs in Sweden
1895 establishments in Sweden
Sport in Gävleborg County